CBM Bethel Hospital was founded by Canadian Baptist Ministries.  It is a participating hospital of Council of Christian Hospitals. CBM Star of Hope Hospital is located in Vuyyuru, Krishna district, Andhra Pradesh, India and was founded in 1906 by missionaries of Canadian Baptist Mission.  It is perhaps the oldest in the region.

History
Canadian Baptist Mission was initiated on request of Thomas Gabriel (missionary) based on which Rev. A. V. Timpany and Rev. John McLaurin who arrived in Ramayapatnam in 1868 moved to Kakinada in 1874 after which Mission got initiated.

In 1904, Dr. Gertrude Hulet arrived in Vuyyuru and opened a dispensary in 1906. Foundation of present hospital structure was laid by Krishna district collector in 1923.

What started as a clinic in 1904 soon developed into a large hospital, taking care of ailing in coastal parts of Krishna district.  A number of wards, case rooms and operating rooms were built. By 1955, hospital became a general hospital.

Evelyn Eaton started a midwifery training course in 1941 and, by 1956, it became an Auxiliary Nurse Midwives (ANMs) course. More than 500 nurses have graduated from this school. The chapel was built in memory of Dr. Hulet in 1957.

Membership
CBM Bethel Hospital is a member of,
 Council of Christian Hospitals, Pithapuram
 Christian Medical Association of India, New Delhi

Hospital also networks with Christian Medical College, Vellore

References

Further reading
 
 
  II
 
 
 

Medical Council of India
Hospitals in Andhra Pradesh
Christian hospitals
Buildings and structures in Krishna district
Canadian Baptist Ministries
1906 establishments in India